Fredd Atkins, born June 19, 1952, is a former mayor and the first African American mayor of Sarasota, Florida. He served as a city commissioner of Sarasota for 18 years and also ran for Sarasota County Commissioner. Atkins ran for the Sarasota County Commission in 2022 and lost with 49.5% of the vote to Mark Smith, who won with 50.5%.

History
Atkins grew up in the community of Newtown in Sarasota, Florida.

References

1952 births
20th-century African-American people
21st-century African-American politicians
21st-century American politicians
African-American mayors in Florida
Florida Democrats
Living people
People from Sarasota, Florida
Mayors of places in Florida